Corydaline is an acetylcholinesterase inhibitor isolated from Corydalis yanhusuo.

Corydaline is a pharmacologically active isoquinoline alkaloid isolated from Corydalis tubers. It also has diverse biological activities. It exhibits the antiacetylcholinesterase(AChE; IC50 = 15 μM), antiallergic, antinociceptive, and gastric emptying activities.

Corydaline exhibited strong nematocidal activity, showed little cytotoxicity and represents a potential treatment for Strongyloidiasis. Corydaline is nematocidal against S. ratti and S. venezuelensis third instar larvae with 50% paralysis (PC50) values of 18 and 30 μM, respectively.

Corydaline exhibits gastrointestinal modulatory, antinociceptive, anti-allergic, and anti-parasitic activities. Corydaline (1 and 3 mg/kg) increases gastric emptying in rat models of apomorphine- and laparotomy-induced delayed gastric emptying. Corydaline is currently in clinical trials as a potential treatment for functional dyspepsia.

In animal models, corydaline increases gastric emptying and small intestine transit speed and induces gastric relaxation.

In other animal models, corydaline inhibits chemically-induced pain. Additionally, this compound may inhibit mast cell-dependent smooth muscle contraction of the aorta.

It inhibits thrombin-induced platelet aggregation in vitro (IC50 = 54.16 μg/ml).

References

Acetylcholinesterase inhibitors
Benzylisoquinoline alkaloids
Plant toxins